Church Hill is an unincorporated community in Franklin County, in the U.S. state of Pennsylvania.

History
Church Hill was named for the Old White Church, which stood near the original town site.

References

Unincorporated communities in Franklin County, Pennsylvania
Unincorporated communities in Pennsylvania